John Keene may refer to:
 John Keene (cricketer) (18731931), English cricketer
 John Keene (physicist) (19211991), English physicist
 John Keene (writer) (born 1965), American writer, translator and professor of English and African American Studies

See also 
 Keene (surname)
 John Kean (disambiguation)
 John Keane (disambiguation)
 John Keen (disambiguation)